USS LST-932 was an  in the United States Navy. Like many of her class, she was not named and is properly referred to by her hull designation.

Construction
LST-932 was laid down on 21 June 1944, at Hingham, Massachusetts, by the Bethlehem-Hingham Shipyard; launched on 22 July 1944; and commissioned on 15 August 1944.

Service history
During World War II, LST-932 was assigned to the Asiatic-Pacific theater and participated in the Lingayen Gulf landings in January 1945, the Mindanao Island landings in April and May 1945, and the assault and occupation of Okinawa Gunto in May and June 1945.

Following the war, she performed occupation duty in the Far East and saw service in China until mid-February 1946. She returned to the United States and was decommissioned on 24 June 1946, and struck from the Navy list on 31 July, that same year. On 29 March 1948, the ship was sold to the Standard Oil Co., for operation.

Awards
LST-932 earned three battle star for World War II service.

Notes

Citations

Bibliography 

Online resources

External links
 

 

LST-542-class tank landing ships
World War II amphibious warfare vessels of the United States
Ships built in Hingham, Massachusetts
1944 ships